Călin Cristian Moldovan (born 10 July 1981) is a Romanian former football goalkeeper.

External links
 
 

1981 births
Living people
Sportspeople from Cluj-Napoca
Romanian footballers
Association football goalkeepers
FC Rapid București players
FC Universitatea Cluj players
CSM Câmpia Turzii players
CF Liberty Oradea players
Romanian football managers